The extinct Mauritius scops owl (Otus sauzieri), also known as Mauritius owl, Mauritius lizard owl, Commerson's owl, Sauzier's owl, or Newton's owl, was endemic to the Mascarene island of Mauritius. It is known from a collection of subfossil bones from the Mare aux Songes swamp, a detailed sketch made by de Jossigny in 1770, a no less detailed description by Desjardins of a bird shot in 1836, and a number of brief reports about owls, the first being those of Van Westzanen in 1602 and Matelief in 1606.

Taxonomy
 
No descriptions of owls were recorded between the mid-17th and the late 18th century. This led to considerable confusion, especially since the bones were referred to ear tuft-less Strix or barn owls, whereas the image and the description unequivocally show the presence of ear tufts. Thus, it was for a long time believed that 2 or even 3 species of owls occurred on the island. 

The supposed "barn owl" Tyto newtoni was described from tarsometatarsus bones of what probably was a male individual of this species, whereas the Mauritius owl's type specimen seems to be a bone of a larger female bird. But the bird was neither a Strix nor a barn owl. Instead, the Mascarene owls of the genus Mascarenotus were most probably members of the scops owl lineage. The Mauritius bird was the largest species of its genus, with a total length of approximately 60 cm. Its scientific name honors Théodore Sauzier, who made the first bones available for scientific study.

In 2018, a DNA study by Louchart and colleagues found that the Mascarenotus owls grouped among species of Otus (the scops owls), and therefore belonged to that genus. The cladogram below shows the placement of the Mauritius scops owl:

Extinction
 
The Mauritius scops owl was the largest carnivore on the island prior to human settlement. Thus, unlike other local species of birds, it was not much affected by the introduction of predators such as cats, rats, and crab-eating macaques. In the 1830s, the species seems to have been not uncommonly found in the southeastern part of the island, between Souillac and the Montagnes Bambous due east of Curepipe, with the last testimony of observations referring to several encounters in 1837. However, as the cultivation of sugarcane and tea encroached upon its habitat, combined with reckless shooting, it disappeared rapidly. In 1859, Clark wrote that the bird was extinct.

References

 Newton, Alfred & Gadow, Hans Friedrich (1893): On additional bones of the Dodo and other extinct birds of Mauritius obtained by Mr. Théodore Sauzier. Trans. Zool. Soc. 13: 281–302, plate 33: figures 11–18.

Extinct birds of Indian Ocean islands
Otus (bird)
Bird extinctions since 1500
Birds of Mauritius
Birds described in 1893
Extinct animals of Mauritius
Species made extinct by human activities
Taxa named by Hans Friedrich Gadow
Mascarenotus
Taxobox binomials not recognized by IUCN